I Gusti Made Oka Sulaksana (also known as Oka Sulaksana; born 29 April 1971) is an Indonesian professional sailor and windsurfer.

Oka won two Asian Games gold medal in 1998 and 2002. He also represented Indonesia in the 1996, 2000, and 2004 Summer Olympics, all of which in Mistral One Design event. He also represented Indonesia in the 2008 Summer Olympics on RS:X event and was the flag-bearer for the country at the opening ceremony.

References

External links
 
 
 

1971 births
Living people
Indonesian windsurfers
Indonesian male sailors (sport)
Olympic sailors of Indonesia
Sailors at the 1996 Summer Olympics – Mistral One Design
Sailors at the 2000 Summer Olympics – Mistral One Design
Sailors at the 2004 Summer Olympics – Mistral One Design
Sailors at the 2008 Summer Olympics – RS:X
Asian Games medalists in sailing
Asian Games gold medalists for Indonesia
Asian Games silver medalists for Indonesia
Asian Games bronze medalists for Indonesia
Sailors at the 1994 Asian Games
Sailors at the 1998 Asian Games
Sailors at the 2002 Asian Games
Sailors at the 2006 Asian Games
Sailors at the 2010 Asian Games
Medalists at the 1998 Asian Games
Medalists at the 2002 Asian Games
Medalists at the 2006 Asian Games
Medalists at the 2010 Asian Games
Southeast Asian Games gold medalists for Indonesia
Southeast Asian Games silver medalists for Indonesia
Southeast Asian Games bronze medalists for Indonesia
Southeast Asian Games medalists in sailing
Competitors at the 2015 Southeast Asian Games
Balinese people
Indonesian Hindus
People from Denpasar
Sportspeople from Bali
20th-century Indonesian people
21st-century Indonesian people